The 2023 1000 Miles of Sebring was a endurance sportscar racing event held on 17 March 2023, as the opening round of the 2023 FIA World Endurance Championship. It was the third running of the event.

Background 
The 1000 Miles of Sebring was the first race for a lot of new and returning manufacturers to the top class of endurance racing: Porsche, Ferrari, Cadillac and Vanwall have entered cars in the Hypercar category for this race. They joined the returning manufacturers of Toyota, Peugeot and Glickenhaus. Alpine was forced to leave the Hypercar class for a 1-year hiatus, returning in 2024.

Customer teams also joined the Hypercar grid. Both Proton Competition and Jota Sport will receive a Porsche 963 later in the year. Unfortunately, these cars will not be delivered to the teams until at least mid-April, but in Proton's case probably until after Le Mans.

This is the first year of the World Endurance Championship without the LMGTE Pro category, after it got dropped in 2022 since manufacturers did not express enough interest in the class.

Entry list 

The entry list was revealed on 1 March 2023. The list of entries for the event consisted of 37 cars across three classes. There were 11 entries in Hypercar, 12 entries in LMP2, and 14 entries in LMGTE Am. Porsche customer Hertz Team Jota entered the No. 48 car in the LMP2 class, due to the fact that the customer Porsche 963's were not yet ready to be delivered.

After an accident in FP2, Proton Competition withdrew their No. 88 Porsche 911 RSR-19 from the event after a collision with the No. 2 Cadillac V-Series.R. The car sustained extensive chassis damage that prevented it from taking part in the race. This withdrawal brought the amount of starting cars down to 36.

Schedule

Free practice
 Only the fastest car in each class is shown.

Qualifying 
Pole position winners in each class are marked in bold.

Race

Race Result 
The minimum number of laps for classification (70% of overall winning car's distance) was 136 laps.

Standings after the race 

2023 Hypercar World Endurance Drivers' Championship

2023 Hypercar World Endurance Manufacturers' Championship

2023 FIA Endurance Trophy for LMP2 Drivers

2023 FIA Endurance Trophy for LMP2 Teams

2023 FIA Endurance Trophy for LMGTE Am Drivers

2023 FIA Endurance Trophy for LMGTE Am Teams

Source:
 Note: Only the top five positions are included for all championship standings.

References 

2023 FIA World Endurance Championship season
2023 in American motorsport
2023 in sports in Florida
March 2023 sports events in the United States